Egidio Perfetti (born 5 June 1975 in Sorengo) is a Norwegian racing driver. He is also a director in the family business Perfetti Van Melle, which is an Italian global manufacturer of confectionery and gum, dating back to the 1940s. Today it is the third largest group in the world in its sector after Mondelez International and Mars Inc. Mentos is one of the Perfetti Van Melle brands which is often promoted on Perfetti's racing cars.

A cosmopolitan, Perfetti was born in Switzerland to an Italian father and Norwegian mother. After a long spell in Asia, Perfetti now resides in Amsterdam, Netherlands, where the family business head office is located.
His nationality is Norwegian and carries a Norwegian passport.

Racing career

Perfetti started his career in 2010 driving in the Porsche Sports Cup Suisse. During 2012-2015 he was driving in Porsche Carrera Cup Asia. He also appeared in Porsche Carrera Cup France and Porsche Mobil 1 Supercup during 2015. For 2016 he was racing a Porsche in the Michelin Le Mans Cup  and also appearing in the Porsche Supercup. He was continuing in the Porsche Mobil 1 Supercup in 2017, while also seen in Porsche Carrera Cup Germany and Porsche Carrera Cup France.

For the 2018-19 FIA WEC 'super season' Perfetti is driving a Porsche 911 RSR in the GTE Am Drivers FIA Endurance Trophy class. In 2018 he has also driven in the Porsche GT3 Challenge USA and Porsche Mobil 1 Supercup.

Complete 24 Hours of Le Mans results

References

External links 

 

1975 births
Living people
Norwegian racing drivers
Norwegian people of Italian descent
24 Hours of Le Mans drivers
FIA World Endurance Championship drivers
Porsche Supercup drivers
Le Mans Cup drivers
GT4 European Series drivers
Porsche Carrera Cup Germany drivers